Ho Mui Mei (born 15 March 1993) is a footballer who plays as a forward for Hong Kong Women League club Citizen AA. Born in Mainland China, she represents Hong Kong internationally.

International career
Ho Mui Mei represented Hong Kong at the 2018 Asian Games, the 2019 EAFF E-1 Football Championship and the 2020 AFC Women's Olympic Qualifying Tournament.

See also
List of Hong Kong women's international footballers

References

1993 births
Living people
Hong Kong women's footballers
Women's association football forwards
Hong Kong women's international footballers